Pride and Prejudice is a novel by Jane Austen. 

Pride and Prejudice may also refer to:

Film
 Pride and Prejudice (1940 film)
 Pride & Prejudice (2005 film)
 Pride & Prejudice (soundtrack)
 Pride & Prejudice: A Latter-Day Comedy, a 2003 film

Television
 Pride and Prejudice (1958 TV series)
 Pride and Prejudice (1967 TV series)
 Pride and Prejudice (1980 TV series)
 Pride and Prejudice (1995 TV series), a BBC series starring Jennifer Ehle and Colin Firth
Pride and Prejudice (2014 TV series), a South Korean TV series

Other uses
 "Pride & Prejudice", a 2017 episode of One Day at a Time
 Pride and Prejudice (musical), a 1993 musical
 Pride and Prejudice* (*sort of) a 2018 play

See also
 Bride and Prejudice, a 2004 Bollywood-style film
 Bride & Prejudice (TV series), a 2017 Australian reality show
 Pride and Prejudice and Zombies
 Pride and Prejudice and Zombies (film)

 The Pride and the Passion, a 1957 movie about the Peninsular War